Pontypridd  is a constituency represented in the House of Commons of the UK Parliament since 2019 by Alex Davies-Jones of the Labour Party.

Boundaries

Pontypridd constituency can be split into two parts, a northern part containing the town itself, and a southern part focussed on Llantrisant. In Pontypridd township itself the wards are: Town, Treforest, Rhondda (consisting of Hopkinstown, Maesycoed, Pantygraigwen, Trehafod, & Pwllgwaun), Graig, Trallwng, Rhydyfelin Central & Ilan, & Hawthorn. The Western half consists of the following wards: Taffs Well, Beddau, Church Village, Tonteg, Llantwit Fardre, Llantrisant, Pontyclun, Talbot Green, Tonyrefail East and Tonyrefail West.

Alternatively, one can think of the constituency as being divided between a 'suburban' district in the south and communities that grew in the industrial revolution to the north; the Southern area, particularly between Church Village and Llantrisant, contains much new residential and light industrial development, and benefits from good transport links due to its proximity to the M4. This section has a growing population and is an important 'dormitory' for Cardiff. The Northern parts, particularly Tonyrefail and the northern end of Pontypridd town consists of large sections of 19th century housing and suffered high unemployment in the 1980s as the old industries closed. However, in recent years, economic recovery has been firm, especially considered with neighbouring constituencies to the north.

The Pontypridd constituency was created in its original form from parts of the old South Glamorganshire & East Glamorganshire constituencies as part of the Representation of the People Act 1918 (sometimes referred to as 'The Fourth Reform Act') which granted virtually all men over 21 the right to vote, extended voting rights to women over 30 years of age, & increased the number of the now abolished University constituencies. Part of this Act also effected a 'General Redistribution of Seats' on an 'equitable basis'. It originally included the old Borough of Cowbridge, the Cowbridge Rural District (which included Ystradowen, Bonvilston, St Athan, Llantwit Major & Llandow) & the Urban District of Pontypridd plus the Rural District of Llantrisant & Llantwit Fardre. The constituency remained unchanged from this form until the Third Periodic Parliamentary Boundary Review's proposals were implemented in 1983. This removed Cowbridge Borough and the southern part of the former Cowbridge Rural District, placing them in the Vale of Glamorgan constituency, and additionally moving the communities of Llanharry, Llanharan, and Brynna (i.e. the northern part of the former Cowbridge RDC) into the Ogmore constituency. However, the communities of Creigiau and Pentyrch were added to the seat at this time.

Prior to 2010 the Pontypridd Constituency also included the Cilfynydd, Glyncoch, Creigiau and Pentyrch Wards. The Fifth Periodic Parliamentary Boundary Review for Wales placed the Cilfynydd and Glyncoch wards in the Cynon Valley (UK Parliament constituency) and the Creigiau and Pentyrch wards in the Cardiff West (UK Parliament constituency). These changes were put in place for the 2010 United Kingdom general election.

Members of Parliament

Like many seats in South Wales, Pontypridd has been held by the Labour party for over 100 years. In all the years since the Labour Party first took the seat in the 1922 by-election, its smallest majority has been the 2,785 (7.6%) by which it held the seat over the Liberal Democrats in 2010. Generally its majorities have been considerably higher.

Elections

Elections in the 1910s

Elections in the 1920s

Elections in the 1930s

Elections in the 1940s

Elections in the 1950s

Elections in the 1960s

Elections in the 1970s

Elections in the 1980s

Elections in the 1990s

Elections in the 2000s

Elections in the 2010s

Of the 96 rejected ballots:
70 were either unmarked or it was uncertain who the vote was for.
26 voted for more than one candidate.

See also
 Pontypridd (Senedd constituency)
 List of parliamentary constituencies in Mid Glamorgan
 List of parliamentary constituencies in Wales
The National Library of Wales:Dictionary of Welsh Biography (Thomas Isaac Mardy Jones)
The National Library for Wales: Dictionary of Welsh Biography (Arthur Pearson)
The National Library for Wales: Dictionary of Welsh Biography (Brynmor John)
Ordnance Survey Election Maps Site
Boundary Commission Map report from 1917 showing original detailed map used for Pontypridd Constituency
Boundary Commission Ordnance Survey Map original used at 1955 review for the entire UK showing all constituencies highly detailed

Footnotes
 In 1983 the Third Periodical Boundary Review report made major changes to the constituency, removing the Cowbridge community & placing it in the new Vale of Glamorgan seat & also by removing the Llanharry & Llanharan communities to the Ogmore seat. However, the Pentyrch & Creigiau communities were added to the new seat from the old Barry seat, to give a new seat with nearly 15,000 fewer electors.
 This was and still is the largest number of electors for the Pontypridd constituency in any of its forms.
 Arthur Pearson's initial selection following a closely contested process at a selection conference at Pontyclun occurred only after several rounds of voting, and he was finally chosen against the prominent local miners' agent W. H. May on 15 January 1938.
 Enacted in the Representation of the People Act 1918 & created from the old East Glamorganshire (which included Pontypridd & the Tonteg/Church Village/Llantwit Fardre areas) & South Glamorganshire (which included the Llantrisant, Tonyrefail, Pontyclun, Llanharry & Cowbridge areas) parliamentary constituencies, the Pontypridd constituency from 1918 to the 1983 UK General Election remained unchanged & consisted of the Pontypridd urban district council area, the Llantrisant and Llantwit Fardre Rural District Council area, the Cowbridge municipal borough, and the Cowbridge Rural District Council area (which included the Llantwit Major, St Athan, Ystradowen, Llandow, Bonvilston, Llanharry, Llanharan & Brynna communities).

Notes

References

External links 
Politics Resources (Election results from 1922 onwards)
Electoral Calculus (Election results from 1955 onwards)
2017 Election House of Commons Library 2017 Election report
A Vision Of Britain Through Time (Constituency elector numbers)

Parliamentary constituencies in South Wales
Politics of Rhondda Cynon Taf
Constituencies of the Parliament of the United Kingdom established in 1918
Pontypridd
1918 establishments in Wales
Mid Glamorgan